Polk may refer to:

People 

 James K. Polk, 11th president of the United States
 Polk (name), other people with the name

Places 
Polk (CTA), a train station in Chicago, Illinois
Polk, Illinois, an unincorporated community
Polk, Missouri, an unincorporated community
Polk, Nebraska, a village
Polk, Ohio, a village
Polk, Pennsylvania, a borough
Polk, West Virginia, an unincorporated community
Polk, Wisconsin, a town
Polk City, Florida, a city
Polk City, Iowa, a city
Polk County (disambiguation)
Polk Street, San Francisco
Polk Township (disambiguation)

Historic structures 
Polk Home, Columbia, Tennessee, sole surviving residence of U.S. President James K. Polk
Polk Hotel, an historic hotel in Haines City, Florida

Military 
Camp Polk (Oregon), a former military installation
Fort Polk, a United States Army base in Leesville, Louisiana
Polk (Cyrillic script: полк), Eastern European military division that corresponds to regiment; polk is headed by polkovnik
 Polk is a root segment in a Slavic words "opolchenie" where phoneme k switches to ch, while the word means militia

Other uses  

POLK, a human gene
Polk Audio, American audio equipment manufacturer
Polk State College, Winter Haven, Florida

See also 
Poke (disambiguation)
Pokeweed, "Polk salad"
Sigmar Polke (1941–2010), German artist